Horná Ves is a village and municipality in Prievidza District in the Trenčín Region of western Slovakia.

History
In historical records the village was first mentioned in 1293.

Geography
The municipality lies at an altitude of 286 metres and covers an area of 18.569 km2. It has a population of about 1080 people.

Genealogical resources

The records for genealogical research are available at the state archive "Statny Archiv in Nitra, Slovakia"

 Roman Catholic church records (births/marriages/deaths): 1688-1896 (parish A)

See also
 List of municipalities and towns in Slovakia

References

External links

 
https://web.archive.org/web/20080111223415/http://www.statistics.sk/mosmis/eng/run.html
Surnames of living people in Horna Ves

Villages and municipalities in Prievidza District